is a 2010 Japanese drama film directed by Kazuyoshi Kumakiri and starring Mitsuki Tanimura and Ryo Kase.

Cast
 Mitsuki Tanimura as Honami Ikawa
 Pistol Takehara as Futa Ikawa
 Ryo Kase as Haruo Meguro
 Masaki Miura as Hiroshi Hagiya
 Takashi Yamanaka as Makoto Kudou
 Kaoru Kobayashi as Ryuzo Hika
 Kaho Minami as Haruyo Hika

Release
The film had its world premiere at the Tokyo International Film Festival in 2010. It was released in Japan on 18 December 2010.

Reception
Dustin Chang of Twitch Film felt that the film "resembles strongly of the neo-neo realism of the Dardenne brothers' films but without their sense of hope". Meanwhile, Maggie Lee of The Hollywood Reporter noted Kazuyoshi Kumakiri's "low key but tender depictions of working class people and subtle assimilation of socio-economical realities, redolent of the works of Jia Zhangke and Wang Bing's West of the Tracks".

References

External links
  
 
 

2010 films
2010 drama films
Japanese drama films
Films directed by Kazuyoshi Kumakiri
2010s Japanese films